Luke Marcus O'Neill (born 20 August 1991) is an English professional footballer who plays as a right back for  club Ebbsfleet United. He graduated from the Leicester City youth academy. He has represented England at under-17 level.

Career

Leicester City
Born in Slough, Berkshire, O'Neill came through the youth academy at Leicester City and was part of the side that won the Premier Academy League in the 2006–07 season. He was named as a substitute for the first time in a League Cup win over Stockport County on 12 August 2008, however he was unused on that occasion.

On 29 August 2008, just a few days after his 17th birthday, O'Neill signed a three-year professional contract, tying him to Leicester until the summer of 2011. He then made his first-team debut for Leicester on 2 September 2008 against Hartlepool United in a 3–0 Football League Trophy win.

O'Neill's next first-team involvement for Leicester came almost a year later when he was named as an unused substitute in their opening day fixture against Swansea City. He made his first appearance of 2009–10 three days later, playing the full 90 minutes as Leicester beat Macclesfield Town 2–0 in the League Cup. On 26 December 2009, O'Neill made his league debut for Leicester, coming on as a half-time substitute against Sheffield United, replacing the injured Jack Hobbs.

Tranmere Rovers 
On 18 February 2010, O'Neill joined League One club Tranmere Rovers on a one-month loan.

Kettering Town 
On 31 January 2011, he joined Conference Premier club Kettering Town on a one-month loan.

Mansfield Town

On 30 June 2011, O'Neill signed for Conference Premier club Mansfield Town on a one-year contract. He made his debut on 13 August 2011 in a 1–1 draw with Bath City, he then later scored his first goal for the club in a 5–0 win over Newport County. O'Neill helped Mansfield to a play-off semi-final where they lost 2–1 on aggregate to York City. His performances throughout 2011–12 attracted Championship clubs Burnley, Cardiff City and Ipswich Town. Burnley had a bid rejected by the Conference club, but manager Paul Cox admitted O'Neill could leave if the offer is right.

Burnley 
On 15 June 2012, O'Neill signed for Championship club Burnley for an undisclosed fee.

York City 
He joined League Two club York City on 4 October 2013 on a 28-day emergency loan. His debut came the following day in a 3–0 away defeat to Torquay United, before scoring his first goal for York in a 2–2 draw away to Chesterfield with a 30-yard shot into the bottom right corner. On 31 October 2013, O'Neill's loan was extended until 4 January 2014, after making six appearances and scoring one goal for York. He was recalled by Burnley a day early on 3 January 2014 to be part of the squad for their FA Cup match against Southampton. He had made 16 appearances and scored one goal for York.

Southend United 
On 17 January 2014, O'Neill joined League Two club Southend United on a 30-day emergency loan.

Scunthorpe United 
He joined Scunthorpe United on 18 August 2014 on a three-month loan, making his debut a day later in a 2–0 home defeat to Fleetwood Town.

Leyton Orient 
On 26 February 2015, he joined Leyton Orient on loan until the end of 2014–15.

Southend United 
O'Neill rejoined Southend United, by this time in League One, on 22 August 2015 on a one-month loan. He had his Burnley contract terminated by mutual consent on 1 September 2015, ahead of a permanent transfer to Southend on a two-year contract. He scored his first goal for Southend in a 3-1 win against Millwall on 17 September 2016.

Gillingham 
O'Neill signed for League One club Gillingham on 6 June 2017 on a two-year contract. He was released by Gillingham at the end of the 2018–19 season.

AFC Wimbledon 
O'Neill signed for League One club AFC Wimbledon on 4 July 2019 on a contract of undisclosed length. He scored his first goal for Wimbledon in an EFL Cup tie against rivals Milton Keynes Dons on 13 August 2019. O'Neill was released by the club at the end of the 2020–21 season.

Return to Kettering Town
In November 2021, he dropped back into non-League football when he signed for National League North club Kettering Town on a free transfer, having previously spent time on loan there in 2011.

Stevenage 
O'Neill signed for League Two club Stevenage on 3 January 2022. He was released at the end of the season.

Career statistics

References

External links

1991 births
Living people
Sportspeople from Slough
English footballers
England youth international footballers
Association football defenders
Leicester City F.C. players
Tranmere Rovers F.C. players
Kettering Town F.C. players
Mansfield Town F.C. players
Burnley F.C. players
York City F.C. players
Southend United F.C. players
Scunthorpe United F.C. players
Leyton Orient F.C. players
Gillingham F.C. players
AFC Wimbledon players
Stevenage F.C. players
English Football League players
National League (English football) players
Footballers from Berkshire